Michele Specht is an American actress and comedian, known for playing Katie in the VH1 series I Hate My 30's and Doctor McKennah in the web series Star Trek Continues.

Biography
The middle of three daughters, Specht was born in Lincoln, Nebraska and raised in Colorado.  She attended Air Academy High School and later earned degrees in Classical Vocal Music Performance and Theatre at College of Saint Benedict and Saint John's University.

Personal life
Specht was in a relationship with actor Vic Mignogna from 2006 to May 2018.

Filmography

Live action

Web originals and short films

Animated roles

Video game roles

References

External links

Living people
American film actresses
American television actresses
American video game actresses
American voice actresses
American women comedians
People from Lincoln, Nebraska
Year of birth missing (living people)
21st-century American women